SpiderMonkey is the first JavaScript engine, written by Brendan Eich at Netscape Communications, later released as open source and currently maintained by the Mozilla Foundation. It is used in the Firefox web browser.

History 
Eich "wrote JavaScript in ten days" in 1995,
having been "recruited to Netscape with the promise of 'doing Scheme' in the browser".
(The idea of using Scheme was abandoned when "engineering management [decided] that the language must 'look like Java.) In late 1996, Eich, needing to "pay off [the] substantial technical debt" left from the first year, "stayed home for two weeks to rewrite Mocha as the codebase that became known as SpiderMonkey". (Mocha was the original working name for the language.)
In 2011, Eich transferred management of the SpiderMonkey code to Dave Mandelin.

Versions

Standards
SpiderMonkey implements the ECMA-262 specification (ECMAScript). ECMA-357 (ECMAScript for XML (E4X)) was dropped in early 2013.

Internals
SpiderMonkey is written in C/C++ and contains an interpreter, the IonMonkey JIT compiler, and a garbage collector.

TraceMonkey
TraceMonkey was the first JIT compiler written for the JavaScript language. Initially introduced as an option in a beta release and introduced in Brendan Eich's blog on August 23, 2008, the compiler became part of the mainline release as part of SpiderMonkey in Firefox 3.5, providing "performance improvements ranging between 20 and 40 times faster" than the baseline interpreter in Firefox 3.

Instead of compiling whole functions, TraceMonkey was a tracing JIT, which operates by recording control flow and data types during interpreter execution. This data then informed the construction of trace trees, highly specialized paths of native code.

Improvements to JägerMonkey eventually made TraceMonkey obsolete, especially with the development of the SpiderMonkey type inference engine. TraceMonkey is absent from SpiderMonkey from Firefox 11 onward.

JägerMonkey
JägerMonkey, internally named MethodJIT, was a whole-method JIT compiler designed to improve performance in cases where TraceMonkey could not generate stable native code. It was first released in Firefox 4 and eventually entirely supplanted TraceMonkey. It has itself been replaced by IonMonkey.

JägerMonkey operated very differently from other compilers in its class: while typical compilers worked by constructing and optimizing a control-flow graph representing the function, JägerMonkey instead operated by iterating linearly forward through SpiderMonkey bytecode, the internal function representation. Although this prohibits optimizations that require instruction reordering, JägerMonkey compiling has the advantage of being very fast, which is useful for JavaScript since recompiling due to changing variable types is frequent.

Mozilla implemented a number of critical optimizations in JägerMonkey, most importantly polymorphic inline caches and type inference.

The difference between TraceMonkey and JägerMonkey JIT techniques and the need for both was explained in a hacks.mozilla.org article. A more in-depth explanation of the technical details was provided by Chris Leary, one of SpiderMonkey's developers, in a blog post. More technical information can be found in other developer's blogs: dvander, dmandelin.

IonMonkey
IonMonkey was a JavaScript JIT compiler of Mozilla, which was aimed to enable many new optimizations that were impossible with the prior JägerMonkey architecture.

IonMonkey was a more traditional compiler: it translated SpiderMonkey bytecode into a control-flow graph, using static single assignment form (SSA) for the intermediate representation. This architecture enabled well-known optimizations from other programming languages to be used for JavaScript, including type specialization, function inlining, linear-scan register allocation, dead code elimination, and loop-invariant code motion.

The compiler can emit fast native code translations of JavaScript functions on the ARM, x86, and x86-64 platforms. It has been the default engine since Firefox 18.

OdinMonkey
OdinMonkey is the name of Mozilla's new optimization module for asm.js, an easily compilable subset of JavaScript. OdinMonkey itself is not a JIT compiler, it uses the current JIT compiler. It's included with Firefox from release 22.

WarpMonkey
The WarpMonkey JIT replaces the former IonMonkey engine from version 83. It is able to inline other scripts and specialize code based on the data and arguments being processed.
It translates the bytecode and Inline Cache data into a Mid-level Intermediate Representation (Ion MIR) representation. This graph is transformed and optimized before being lowered to a Low-level Intermediate Representation (Ion LIR). This LIR performs register allocation and then generates native machine code in a process called Code Generation.
The optimizations here assume that a script continues to see data similar what has been seen before. The Baseline JITs are essential to success here because they generate ICs that match observed data. If after a script is compiled with Warp, it encounters data that it is not prepared to handle it performs a bailout. The bailout mechanism reconstructs the native machine stack frame to match the layout used by the Baseline Interpreter and then branches to that interpreter as though we were running it all along. Building this stack frame may use special side-table saved by Warp to reconstruct values that are not otherwise available.

Use
SpiderMonkey is intended to be embedded in other applications that provide host environments for JavaScript. An incomplete list follows:
 Mozilla Firefox, Thunderbird, SeaMonkey, and other applications that use the Mozilla application framework
Forks of Firefox including the Pale Moon, Basilisk and Waterfox web browsers.
Data storage applications:
MongoDB moved from V8 to SpiderMonkey in version 3.2
Riak uses SpiderMonkey as the runtime for JavaScript MapReduce operations
CouchDB database system (written in Erlang). JavaScript is used for defining maps, filters, reduce functions and viewing data, for example in HTML format.
Adobe Acrobat and Adobe Reader, Adobe Flash Professional, and Adobe Dreamweaver. Adobe Acrobat DC uses Spidermonkey 24.2 with ECMA-357 support forward ported.
 GNOME desktop environment, version 3 and later
 Yahoo! Widgets, formerly named Konfabulator
 FreeSWITCH, open-source telephony engine, uses SpiderMonkey to allow users to write call management scripts in JavaScript
 The text-based web browser ELinks uses SpiderMonkey to support JavaScript
 Parts of SpiderMonkey are used in the Wine project's JScript (re-)implementation
 Synchronet, a BBS, e-mail, Web, and application server using the SpiderMonkey engine
 JavaScript OSA, a SpiderMonkey inter-process communication language for the Mac computer
 0 A.D., a real-time strategy game
 SpiderMonkey is also used in many other open-source projects; an external list is maintained at Mozilla's developer site.

SpiderMonkey includes a JavaScript Shell for interactive JavaScript development and for command-line invocation of JavaScript program files.

See also

 Rhino (JavaScript engine)
 List of ECMAScript engines

References

External links
 , SpiderMonkey (JavaScript-C) engine
 Firefox (and Spidermonkey) Release Calendar

Cross-platform software
JavaScript engines
Mozilla
Software using the Mozilla license